Kazan Gymnasium was a gymnasium of Kazan, Tatarstan, Russia. It is notable for its alumnus, Nikolai Ivanovich Lobachevsky, who graduated from the school in 1807. Other notable alumni include Ivan Shishkin, a Russian landscape artist, and Gavrila Derzhavin, a poet.

The school was established during the reign of Elizabeth of Russia.

References

Gymnasiums in Russia
Education in Kazan
Educational institutions established in the 18th century
Schools in Russia
18th-century establishments in the Russian Empire
History of Kazan